Lithognathus is a marine fish genus in the family Sparidae, members of which are commonly known as steenbras. They are primarily found in coastal regions in Southern Africa (South Africa, Namibia and Angola), but L. mormyrus also occurs in the Mediterranean Sea, Black Sea, Bay of Biscay and off various islands in the northeast Atlantic.

It is parasitized by Cymothoa exigua.

Species 
The World Register of Marine Species lists the following four species :
Lithognathus aureti Smith, 1962 - West coast seabream
Lithognathus lithognathus (Cuvier, 1829) - White steenbras
Lithognathus mormyrus (Linnaeus, 1758) - Sand steenbras
Lithognathus olivieri Penrith & Penrith, 1969 - Steenbras

References

 
Extant Miocene first appearances
Marine fish genera
Taxa named by William John Swainson
Taxonomy articles created by Polbot